Electrica North Transylvania is a Romanian company that distributes and supplies electric power for 1,089,192  customers in Cluj, Bihor, Maramureș, Satu Mare, Salaj and Bistrița-Năsăud.

Electrica North Transylvania with its headquarters in Cluj-Napoca, unfolds its activity in an area of 34,160 km2.

The Electricity Supply and Distribution Branch North Transylvania sold, in 2002, over 3,845,622 MWh, a sales level that ranges it among the first at the national level from this point of view. Electrica North Transylvania  administrates 39,996 km of electric lines – aerial and subterraneous, 90 transformation stations and 7,535 supply units and transformation stations.

Distribution

References

External links
Official site

Electric power companies of Romania
Companies based in Cluj-Napoca